Debraj Ray may refer to:

 Debraj Ray (economist) (born 1957), Indian-American economist
 Debraj Ray (actor) (born 1954), Indian actor